Serta may refer to:
 Sertã, a municipality in central Portugal
 Sertã (parish), a civil parish in the municipality
 Serta (company), a mattress company based in the United States
 Serto, the western form of the Syriac alphabet
 An alternative spelling of Sêrtar County, Garzê Tibetan Autonomous Prefecture, People's Republic of China
 Serta, an ancient and titular bishopric of the Catholic Church in North Africa